Banghaasia is a genus of moths of the family Yponomeutidae. It contains only one species, Banghaasia ildefonsella, which is found in Spain.

References

Yponomeutidae
Monotypic moth genera
Moths of Europe
Moths described in 1960